John Derricke (fl. 1578–1581) was the author and artist of The Image of Irelande, with a Discoverie of Woodkarne, a 1581 book describing the Irish campaigns of Lord Deputy Henry Sidney.

The book's dedication to Sir Philip Sidney was signed at Dublin on 16 June 1578, indicating that Derricke completed the book in Ireland and was likely an eyewitness to the events therein. Katherine Duncan-Jones connects Derricke's dedication to an assumption that Sir Philip would succeed Sir Henry, his father, as Lord Deputy. He probably returned to England with Sidney in 1578, after which his illustrations would have been engraved and his book published in London by John Day in 1581.

He was in all likelihood also the John Derick who was appointed to collect custom duty on wine imported into Drogheda port in 1569.

Notes

References
 Anthony M. McCormack and Terry Clavin, "Derricke, John", Dictionary of Irish Biography, (Eds.) James Mcguire and James Quinn, Cambridge University Press, 2009.

External links

Irish writers
16th-century Irish people
Year of birth missing
Year of death missing